This list of National Park System areas in Maryland includes the lands, trails, or park networks maintained by the National Park Service of the United States within the U.S. State of Maryland. The National Park Service controls 24 units in the state of Maryland. They range from sites of historical interest to sites of ecological interest to portions of the parkway system around Washington, DC. Many of the sites currently under the control of the National Park Service in Maryland were previously under the control of other agencies in the federal government, such as Antietam National Battlefield, which was originally managed by the Department of War. There are eight units administered by the National Park System as part of the National Capital Parks. The most recent unit created in Maryland is the Captain John Smith Chesapeake National Historic Trail, which was authorized by Congress in 2006.

National Park System areas

See also 
List of Maryland state parks
List of National Historic Landmarks in Maryland

Notes
 A  Part of the National Capital Parks.
 B  Antietam National Battlefield was originally two separate units, a cemetery established in 1865 and the battlefield established in 1890 under the War department. Both the battlefield and the cemetery were transferred to the National Park Service from the War Department in 1933, and the two units were combined in 1974.

References

External links 
Find a Park in Maryland - official site of the National Park Service

Maryland

National Parks